In algebraic topology, a G-fibration or principal fibration is a generalization of a principal G-bundle, just as a fibration is a generalization of a fiber bundle. By definition, given a topological monoid G, a G-fibration is a fibration p: P→B together with a continuous right monoid action P × G → P such that
(1)  for all x in P and g in G.
(2) For each x in P, the map  is a weak equivalence.

A principal G-bundle is a prototypical example of a G-fibration. Another example is Moore's path space fibration: namely, let  be the space of paths of various length in a based space X. Then the fibration  that sends each path to its end-point is a G-fibration with G the space of loops of various lengths in X.

References 

Algebraic topology
Differential geometry
Fiber bundles